Scytonotus is a genus of flat-backed millipedes in the family Polydesmidae. There are about 17 described species in Scytonotus.

Species
These 17 species belong to the genus Scytonotus:

 Scytonotus australis Hoffman, 1962
 Scytonotus bergrothi Chamberlin, 1911
 Scytonotus cavernarus Bollman, 1887
 Scytonotus columbianus Chamberlin, 1920
 Scytonotus granulatus (Say, 1821) (granulated millipede)
 Scytonotus inornatus Shelley, 1994
 Scytonotus insulanus Attems, 1931
 Scytonotus laevicollis Koch, 1847
 Scytonotus michauxi Hoffman, 1962
 Scytonotus multituberculatus (Carl, 1905)
 Scytonotus nodulosus Koch, 1847
 Scytonotus orthodox Chamberlin, 1925
 Scytonotus pallidus Attems, 1931
 Scytonotus piger Chamberlin, 1910
 Scytonotus scabricollis Koch & C.L., 1847
 Scytonotus simplex Chamberlin, 1941
 Scytonotus virginicus (Loomis, 1943)

References

Further reading

 
 

Polydesmida
Articles created by Qbugbot